New Silesia ( or Neu-Schlesien) was a small province of the Kingdom of Prussia from 1795 to 1807, created after the Third Partition of Poland. It was located northwest of Kraków and southeast of Częstochowa, in the lands that had been part of the Duchy of Siewierz and the adjacent Polish historical province of Lesser Poland (the Kraków Voivodeship), including the towns of Żarki, Pilica, Będzin, and Sławków.

New Silesia had its capital at Siewierz. However, it was originally to be governed by the Silesian capital Breslau (Wrocław) and later largely administered by South Prussia. After the defeat of Prussia in the War of the Fourth Coalition in 1806, the province was dissolved and the territory was made part of the Napoleonic Duchy of Warsaw in the Treaties of Tilsit of 1807.

See also 
South Prussia
New East Prussia
Partitions of Poland
Prussia

External links 
Neu-Schlesien at Genealogy.net 

History of Silesia
Provinces of Prussia
States and territories established in 1795
1795 establishments in Prussia
History of Lesser Poland
1807 disestablishments in Prussia